D2 or Kursko-Rizhsky Diameter is the second of the Moscow Central Diameters, a suburban network in Moscow which uses the existing infrastructure of Moscow Railway and provides a regular connection between Moscow and surrounding cities. MCD-2 runs from Nakhabino via Krasnogorsk and Moscow to Podolsk.

The line was opened on 21 November 2019, at the same day as D1. It uses the tracks and the stations of the Rizhsky and the Kursky suburban railway line. These suburban railway lines have been connected earlier, and through suburban trains were running between them, therefore the initial investment to open the line was minimum.

Modified Ivolga trains have been serving the line since its opening.

Stations
The stations between Volokolamskaya and Ostafyevo are in Moscow, others are in Moscow Oblast.

Moskva Tovarnaya is set to close.

References

 
Moscow Railway
Railway lines in Russia
Railway lines opened in 2019
2019 establishments in Russia